Nanos homolog 1 (Drosophila) is a protein that in humans is encoded by the NANOS1 gene.

References

Further reading